Dr. Rubén Remigio Ferro (born 1960 in Pinar del Río) is the first Afro-Cuban president (chief justice)  of the People's Supreme Court of Cuba.

Dr. Ferro was a judge and lawyer in the province of Pinar del Río, and a provincial judge in the 1980-1990s. He has been a diputado to the National Assembly of People's Power since 1998, representing the municipality of Mantua.

He was active in the Union of Communist Youth (UJC) and the Federation of University Students (FEU). In 1997, he was appointed Vice President of the People's Supreme Court and in 1998 was promoted to president.

References
 Gannett News Service article

Government ministers of Cuba
1960 births
Living people
Communist Party of Cuba politicians
Cuban judges